Shinobu Kitayama (born March 9, 1957) is a Japanese social psychologist and the Robert B. Zajonc Collegiate Professor of Psychology at the University of Michigan. He is also the Social Psychology Area Chair and Director of the Culture & Cognition Program at the University of Michigan. He is the editor-in-chief of the Attitudes and Social Cognition section of the Journal of Personality and Social Psychology. He received his bachelor's degree and master's degree from Kyoto University and his doctorate from the University of Michigan. Together with Mayumi Karasawa, he discovered the birthday-number effect, the subconscious tendency of people to prefer the numbers in the date of their birthday over other numbers. Prof. Kitayama is best known for his work on the social psychology of culture as it relates to the self. He and Hazel Rose Markus have argued that Western selves are constructed as independent from others, and people from many East Asian cultures construct interdependent selves, based on the fundamental relatedness of individuals to each other. These differently constructed selves deeply affect how people see the world, how they experience emotions, how they organize their experience, and what they value.

References

External links
Faculty page
Profile at Social Psychology Network

1957 births
Living people
Japanese psychologists
People from Shizuoka (city)
Kyoto University alumni
University of Michigan alumni
University of Michigan faculty
Academic journal editors
Social psychologists
Japanese emigrants to the United States
Cultural psychologists